PalaOnda or Eiswelle, called Sparkasse Arena since 2022 for sponsorship reasons, is an indoor sports arena in Bolzano, Italy. It was built to host the 1994 Men's World Ice Hockey Championships along with Forum di Assago and has a capacity of 7,200. It is the home arena of several ice hockey teams, including HC Bolzano of the ICE Hockey League and the EVB Eagles Südtirol of the European Women's Hockey League (EWHL).

The arena also hosted the 1998 European Handball Championships and the 2010–11 CEV Champions League final four.

See also
 List of indoor arenas in Italy

References

External links
  
  
Arena information 
Arena picture 
Former official website (Archived) 

Indoor ice hockey venues in Italy
Indoor arenas in Italy
Buildings and structures in Bolzano
Sport in South Tyrol
Sports venues completed in 1993
1993 establishments in Italy